The First Battle of Boudouaou in 25 - 26 May 1837, during the French conquest of Algeria, pitted the troupes coloniales under Colonel Maximilien Joseph Schauenburg against the troops of Kabylia of the Igawawen.

Historical Context

When Emir Abdelkader was preparing to negotiate a truce with the French invaders in 1837 in order to devote himself to building his Emirate which would then encircle the Casbah of Algiers, he then stepped up his attacks against agricultural farms and French military posts in Mitidja to balance the balance of power to its advantage.

He then set up his command center in Titteri mountain range and, from 8 May 1837, caused an insurrection of the Kabyles of the Khachna mountain range, the Beni Aïcha region and the Issers plain to the east of the rich plain of Mitidja.

This is how the attack on the Mercier farm in Réghaïa by the rebels commanded by Emir Mustapha, brother of Emir Abdelkader, was going to create an already fragile military shift between the French soldiers and the Kabyle rebels who had imposed themselves and content to reign east of the  since the fall of power in Algiers during 1830.

This attack was followed by looting and sacking of this agricultural farm overlooking the Kabyle country, and this upheaval at the gates of Algiers forced Governor General Charles-Marie Denys de Damrémont and his lieutenant General Alexandre Charles Perrégaux to undertake a military expedition on 17 May 1837. on the Beni Aïcha and the Issers to counter the allies of Emir Abdelkader and push them back towards the eastern shore of Oued Isser.

The bitter failure that Colonel Maximilien Joseph Schauenburg suffered during the expedition to the Col des Beni Aïcha during the day of 18 May 1837 because of the bad weather which had fallen on his military column in this spring season and because of its ignorance of the marshy and bushy terrain of the Beni Aïcha region around Meraldene River, dealt a terrible blow to the morale of the troupes coloniales  engaged in the expedition, but also to the soldiers who had remained stationed in a military camp in the joint ownership of Boudouaou.

The Kabyles of Beni Aïcha under the direction of the marabout Cheikh Ali Boushaki had been reinforced and backed up by the reinforcements arrived from Laazib Zamoum under the direction of Cheikh Ben Zamoum, and who all together thwarted the expedition of Colonel Schauenburg who is then withdrawn in the haste and the rout towards the camp of Boudouaou to spare its troops of a programmed and imminent decimation.

Boudouaou Camp

When Colonel Schauenburg brought back from the Col des Beni Aïcha on 19 May 1837 his three thousand soldiers to the Boudouaou camp by a very strong sustained march to flee the Kabyles who were defending their land, they then found a supply convoy there to meet their food needs.

The Boudouaou camp allowed these French soldiers to withdraw safely after having consumed all their food which was only enough for three days of expedition, and this supply convoy found in Boudouaou fell at the peak to fill the bags of the soldiers who had emptied in those cold and harsh days.

But when the French column was going to dodge the harassment of the rebels which had lasted since the morning, and was going to arrive at a natural fountain to quench their thirst before reaching Boudouaou, the kabyles of Cheikh Ali Boushaki and of Cheikh Ben Zamoum attempted a double attack on Schauenburg'''s troops.

Indeed, the Amraoua cavalry undertook a lateral attack on the beach of the sea of Boudouaou El Bahri, while the Kabyle infantry of the Beni Aïcha was stationed on the heights to surround and attack the French invaders.

Colonel Schauenburg had guessed this movement of the Kabyles, and he ordered fire shells to be fired from two pieces of mountain, and to launch scuffles of the infantry which was ambushed.

This French response then stopped the Kabyle riders, while an offensive return of the  soldiers was carried out trying to outflank the Kabyles, and this gave the column time to cross the parade which preceded the haven of peace of Boudouaou.

The Kabyles temporarily contented themselves with tracking down the French to Boudouaou and did not continue their pursuit to the military camp.

General Damrémont took advantage of this escapade and this withdrawal, hoping that the Kabyle uprising was going to abort, and believed to be able to have military troops to promote an expedition to the West of Algeria to reinforce General Thomas Robert Bugeaud (1784–1849).

But Damrémont did not order to leave the valley of Boudouaou, and he wanted to perpetuate the French presence at the entrance of Kabylia by permanently threatening the Beni Aïcha and the Issers, and this by the establishment of a fortified and entrenched camp at Boudouaou, which is a strategic position equidistant from the various valleys of Sebaou, Issers and Meraldene on the one hand and the Mitidja plain on the other.

Garrison

From 8 May to 25 May 1837, the Emir Abdelkader forced General Damrémont to mobilize a garrison and a body of troops stationed in the Boudouaou camp in a stronghold at the entrance to Kabylia in order to defend Algiers against a possible attack by rebels and Kabyle dissidents.

These hundreds of French soldiers posted and exposed in the Boudouaou ravine were already a sign of success for Emir Abdelkader to have forced the French to build one more isolated military post, with all the embarrassments and all the dangers to the soldiers involved in each new sedentary establishment.

The garrison that was maintained at Boudouaou was made up of only one battalion, which was a latent and indirect victory for the Kabyle who hoped for a more striking and immediate triumph by attacking this reduced number of French soldiers who had been left behind on the spot to raise the redoubt.

Battle
The leaders of the Kabyle coalition, Cheikh Ali Boushaki and Cheikh Ben Zamoum, did not miss such a great opportunity to attack with superior Algerian forces this weak detachment of French soldiers, before their work of building the camp of Boudouaou protected and sheltered them from rebel attacks.

The construction and the shoulder of the camp had still very little to be completed, when at sunrise of 25 May 1837 about five thousand five hundred (5.500) Kabyles on foot and five hundred (500) horsemen on horseback appeared on the east bank of the Oued Boudouaou, in front of the French bivouac.

The French soldiers surprised in the camp by the Kabyle attack were then commanded by the battalion chief the Commandant Antoine de La Torré'' (1787-1851), of the 2nd light regiment, and they were then only nine hundred (900) infantrymen, of the 2nd light regiment and 48th line regiment, and forty-five (45) riders on horse, of the 1st hunter regiment, with two mountain howitzers supplied with four  shots.

Gallery

See also
 Emir Abdelkader
 Emirate of Abdelkader
 Igawawen
 French conquest of Algeria
 First Raid on Reghaïa (1837)
 Expedition of the Col des Beni Aïcha (1837)
 First Battle of the Issers  (1837)
 List of French governors of Algeria
 Charles-Marie Denys de Damrémont
 Maximilien Joseph Schauenburg
 Alexandre Charles Perrégaux 
 Antoine de La Torré

External links

Bibliography

References

Conflicts in 1837
1837 in Algeria
Battles involving Algeria
Battles involving France
May 1837 events
1830s in Algeria
French colonial empire
Invasions by France
19th century in Algeria
Algerian War
Rebellions in Africa
Wars involving the states and peoples of Africa
Wars of independence